The South Africa miners strike was a one-day strike by the National Union of Mineworkers of South Africa over working conditions and safety in the country's mining industry. It was the first ever industry-wide miners' strike in South African history.

History
On 27 November 2007, the National Union of Mineworkers announced that South African mineworkers would go on strike to protest unsafe working conditions.

Strike
On 4 December 2007, the strike affected over 240,000 workers in 60 of the nation's mines. The strike was spurred on by a rise in worker fatalities from 2006 to 2007, despite a government plan in October to reduce fatalities. Between 5,000 and 30,000 people showed up to a rally in Johannesburg to protest the dangerous working conditions.

Less than 5% of mineworkers came to work on that day.

Reaction
AngloPlat announced it had slashed yearly production goals by 9,000 ounces due to the strike.

References

South Africa Miners Strike, 2007
South Africa Miners Strike, 2007
South Africa miners' strike
Labour disputes in South Africa
Miners' labor disputes in Africa